Aaron McCollough is an American poet.

Life and career
Aaron McCollough was born in 1971 in Columbus, Ohio and raised in Tennessee.  He has a BA from the University of the South (1994), an MA in English Literature from North Carolina State University (1998), an MFA in creative writing from the Iowa Writers' Workshop (2001), as well as an MA and PhD in English Language and Literature from the University of Michigan (2002 & 2007 respectively).  Having worked at the University of Michigan Library and University of Michigan Press for a number of years, he began as Scholarly Communications & Publishing Librarian at the University of Illinois in August 2015.

In 2001, McCollough started the online poetry magazine GutGult.  The magazine published eight issues between 2001 and 2010. Along with Karla Kelsey, he now edits a small press called SplitLevel Texts.

Book Publications
Rank University of Iowa Press, 2015. , 
Underlight Ugly Duckling Presse, 2012. , 
No Grave Can Hold My Body Down Ahsahta Press, 2011. , 
Little Ease Ahsahta Press, 2006. , 
Double Venus Salt Publishing, 2003. , 
Welkin, published by Ahsahta Press in 2002. ,

Publication in Anthologies
Hick Poetics: Anthology of Contemporary Rural American Poetry
The Arcadia Project: North American Postmodern Pastoral
Isn't It Romantic: 100 Love Poems by Younger American Poets
Joyful Noise: An Anthology of American Spiritual Poetry
Gamers: Writers, Artists, and Programmers on the Pleasure of Pixels

Publications in Periodicals
McCollough has published poems in 1913, 6 x 6, Boston Review, jubilat, A Public Space, Denver Quarterly, Colorado Review, Fence, Quarterly West, The Canary, VOLT, American Letters & Commentary, Conduit, LIT, Slope, Carolina Quarterly, Jacket, Court Green, and numerous other journals.

Reviews
McCollough's books have been reviewed in print journals including Denver Quarterly, Colorado Review, and Publishers Weekly as well as in online journals such as Free Verse, Coldfront, NewPages and Eclectica.

Awards
Gertrude Stein Award in Innovative Poetry, 2005.
Sawtooth Poetry Prize, Ahsahta Press, for Welkin, 2001.
Bain-Swiggett Poetry Prize, 1993.

Teaching
McCollough has taught at North Carolina State University, The University of Iowa, and The University of Michigan.  He was a visiting poet at Hendrix College.

References

External links
 Aaron McCollough's official website
 "Here Comes Everybody" Interview
 GutCult, a poetry magazine edited by Aaron McCollough

1971 births
Living people
Writers from Columbus, Ohio
American male poets
Iowa Writers' Workshop alumni
University of Michigan alumni
21st-century American poets
21st-century American male writers